This article provides a list of articles which contain lists of wars and conflicts.

There are various sets of such lists, based upon different criteria for grouping individual wars, as shown below.

Lists based on specific historical criteria

Lists based on time period
Below is a set of articles which each provide a list of wars within a specific time period, each covering at least several decades or more.
List of wars: before 1000
 List of wars: 1000–1499
List of wars: 1500–1799
List of wars: 1800–1899
List of wars: 1900–1944
List of wars: 1945–1989
List of wars: 1990–2002
List of wars: 2003–present
 List of ongoing armed conflicts

Lists by region

 List of conflicts in North America
 List of conflicts in the United States
 List of conflicts in Canada
 List of conflicts in Central America
 List of conflicts in South America
 List of conflicts in Europe
 List of conflicts in Asia
 List of wars involving Iran
 List of Chinese wars and battles
 Conflicts in the Middle East
 List of conflicts in the Near East (until 1918)
 List of modern conflicts in the Middle East (after 1918)
 List of conflicts in Africa
 Conflicts in the Horn of Africa (East Africa)
 List of modern conflicts in North Africa (Maghreb)
 Military history of Africa

Wars by type of conflict

 List of wars of independence
 List of military conflicts spanning multiple wars
 List of world wars
 List of border wars
 List of wars extended by diplomatic irregularity
 List of wars between democracies
 List of wars of succession
 List of civil wars
 List of proxy wars
 List of invasions
 List of interstate wars since 1945
 Frozen conflicts

See also

General history
 Human history
 Military history

Military history articles by region
 Military history of Europe

Categories
:Category: Military history by continent
:Category: Military history by country
:Category: Military history by period

wars
 
wars